Wálter Machado da Silva (January 2, 1940 – September 29, 2020), better known as "Silva Batuta" in Brazil, or Machado da Silva in Argentina, was a Brazilian footballer.

He earned 6 caps (3 non-official) for the Brazil national football team and was part of the Brazilian squad at the 1966 FIFA World Cup.

Silva Batuta died on 29 September 2020 at the age of 80.

References

1940 births
2020 deaths
Brazilian footballers
Brazilian expatriate footballers
Brazil international footballers
1966 FIFA World Cup players
Argentine Primera División players
Racing Club de Avellaneda footballers
Santos FC players
São Paulo FC players
Botafogo Futebol Clube (SP) players
Sport Club Corinthians Paulista players
CR Flamengo footballers
Barcelona S.C. footballers
CR Vasco da Gama players
Expatriate footballers in Argentina
Expatriate footballers in Ecuador
Association football forwards
People from Ribeirão Preto
Footballers from São Paulo (state)